Matías Armando Leiva Arancibia (born 24 July 1999) is a Chilean footballer who plays for San Marcos de Arica in the Segunda División Profesional de Chile.

International career
At under-20 level, Leiva represented Chile in the 2018 South American Games, winning the gold medal.

Honours
Chile U20
 South American Games Gold medal: 2018

References

External links
 
 

1999 births
Living people
Sportspeople from Viña del Mar
Chilean footballers
Chile under-20 international footballers
Everton de Viña del Mar footballers
San Luis de Quillota footballers
San Marcos de Arica footballers
Chilean Primera División players
Primera B de Chile players
Segunda División Profesional de Chile players
Association football forwards
South American Games gold medalists for Chile
South American Games medalists in football
Competitors at the 2018 South American Games